Siegfried Sudhaus (9 July 1863 in Treptow an der Rega – 22 October 1914 near Bixschoote, Belgium) was a German classical philologist, known for his scholarly treatment of Menander and Philodemus.

He studied classical philology at the universities of Bonn and Berlin, and from 1892 worked as a schoolteacher at the municipal gymnasium in Bonn. In 1898 he received his habilitation for classical philology, and afterwards, by way of a travel scholarship from the Deutsches Archäologisches Institut, he embarked on a study trip to Greece. In 1901 he was named a professor of classical philology at the University of Kiel, where in 1912/13 he served as academic rector. Among his better known students at Kiel was papyrologist Christian Cornelius Jensen. As a volunteer in World War I, he died on 22 October 1914 near the town of Bixschoote in Flanders (First Battle of Ypres).

Published works 
 Prolegomena ad Philodemi Rhetorica, 1892.
 Philodemi Volumina rhetorica edidit, 1892 
 Philodemi Volumina rhetorica edidit (supplement), 1895. 
 Aetna. In: Sammlung wissenschaftlicher Commentare zu griechischen und römischen Schriftstellern, 1898. 
 Der Aufbau der Plautinischen Cantica, 1909 – The structure of Plautine canticles.
 Menandri Reliquiae nuper repertae, 1914.
 Menanderstudien, 1914 – Menander studies.

References 

1863 births
1914 deaths
People from Trzebiatów
University of Bonn alumni
Humboldt University of Berlin alumni
Academic staff of the University of Kiel
German classical philologists
German papyrologists